The flyweight division has been added as the lightest weight category for the 1972 Summer Olympics.  It had been contested international since 1969.  Only men competed in all the weight classes.

Results
Total of best lifts in military press, snatch and jerk.  Ties are broken by the lightest bodyweight.

Final

Key: WR = world record; OR = Olympic record; =OR = equaled Olympic record; DNF = did not finish; DQ = disqualified; NVL = no valid lift

References

External links
Official report

Weightlifting at the 1972 Summer Olympics